Hanshin Arena Shopping Plaza is a shopping mall in Zuoying District, Kaohsiung, Taiwan that opened on July 10, 2008. It has been the shopping mall with the highest annual revenue in Kaohsiung since 2012. The mall is located in close proximity to the Kaohsiung Arena, which was opened in the same year, and is in walking distance from the Kaohsiung Arena metro station.

History
 Construction began in August 2004.
 Construction completed in July 2008.
 Trial operation began on July 8, 2008.
 Hanshin Arena Shopping Plaza officially opened on July 10, 2008.
 In 2014, Hanshin Shopping Plaza opened a branch store in Xi'an, China. The cinema has 13 halls and 2,000 seats. The catering industry accounts for 25% to 30% of the total area.

Gallery

See also
 List of tourist attractions in Taiwan

References

External links

2008 establishments in Taiwan
Shopping malls in Kaohsiung
Shopping malls established in 2008